Bina Agarwal is an Indian development economist and Professor of Development Economics and Environment at the Global Development Institute at The University of Manchester. She has written extensively on land, livelihoods and property rights; environment and development; the political economy of gender; poverty and inequality; legal change; and agriculture and technological transformation. Among her best known works is the award-winning book—A Field of One's Own: Gender and Land Rights in South Asia—which has had a significant impact on governments, NGOs, and international agencies in promoting women's rights in land and property. This work has also inspired research in Latin America and globally.

Early life 
Agarwal's parents were Suraj Mal and Shyama Devi Agarwal, Agarwal named a book prize in their honour. She earned her B.A. and M.A. from the University of Cambridge, and her doctorate in Economics from the Delhi School of Economics, University of Delhi, her dissertation was Mechanization in Indian Agriculture: An Analytical Study Based on the Punjab.

Career 
Her university positions include posts at Princeton, Harvard, Michigan, Minnesota, and New York University. At Harvard she was the first Daniel Ingalls Visiting Professor Agarwal has also been President of the International Society for Ecological Economics. Vice-President of the International Economic Association, President of the International Association for Feminist Economics, on the Board of the Global Development Network, and one of the twenty-one members of the Commission on the Measurement of Economic Performance and Social Progress, chaired by Nobel Laureate Joseph Stiglitz. She has served on the UN Committee for Development Policy (New York) and UNRISD (Geneva). She holds honorary doctorates from the Institute of Social Studies in the Netherlands and the University of Antwerp in Belgium.

Concepts and areas of focus 
Agarwal's expertise is on subjects related to rural economy. She has creatively used diverse methodologies (from econometric analysis to qualitative assessments) and an interdisciplinary approach, to provide insights on land, livelihoods and property rights; environment and development; the political economy of gender; poverty and inequality; law; and agriculture and technological change. She deals especially with the connectedness of gender inequality, social exclusion, property, and development. Her pioneering work has had an impact globally both within the academia and among policy makers and practitioners. A large part of her work compares countries, especially within South Asia. In A Field of One's Own (Cambridge University Press, 1994), her most famous work, Agarwal stresses that "the single most important factor affecting women's situation is the gender gap in command over property." She is also on the editorial board of the Journal of Women, Politics & Policy.

Spurred on by Agarwal's work, and the successful movement she led in 2004–2005, Indian policy makers passed the Hindu Succession (Amendment) Act in 2005. This Act gives all Hindu women (married and unmarried) equal rights with men in the ownership and inheritance of property, in particular agricultural land.

Agarwal has consistently challenged standard economic analysis and assumptions. In her writings on the "bargaining approach" to intra-family relations, she challenges unitary household models and extends formal bargaining models to highlight the importance of social norms, social perceptions and property ownership in determining women's bargaining power. She also demonstrates the interconnectedness of the family, the community, the market and the state in determining a person's bargaining power in any one sphere. Her paper "Bargaining and Gender Relations" is the single most downloaded paper to date in the journal Feminist Economics. In another article "Bargaining and Legal Change", Agarwal examines how women in India were able to bargain with the State to pass the inheritance laws of 1956 and bring about its amendment in 2005.

In another important extension of her work on gender, property and power, Agarwal demonstrates in her empirically rigours article "Towards Freedom from Domestic Violence", that women's ability to own and inherit land acts as a significant deterrent against marital violence. Her recent books include: Psychology, Rationality and Economic Behaviour (coedited; Palgrave, 2005), Capabilities, Freedom and Equality (co-edited, Oxford University Press, Delhi, 2006). Her most recently authored book is Gender and Green Governance (Oxford University Press, Oxford and Delhi, 2010) which has been widely cited and favourably reviewed in both academic journals and the popular press (EPW and Indian Express).

Positions and awards 
Bina Agarwal has held distinguished positions at many international universities, including Harvard (she was the first Daniel Ingalls Visiting Professor), the University of Michigan (Ann Arbor), the University of Minnesota (where she held the Winton Chair), and the New York University School of Law. In 2006–07, Agarwal was also a visiting research fellow at the Kennedy School of Government of Harvard University.  In addition, she has been vice-president of the International Economic Association, president of the International Association for Feminist Economics, and on the board of the Global Development Network. Agarwal is a founding member of the Indian Society for Ecological economics. She is one of only two women who served on the Commission for the Measurement of Economic Performance and Social Progress, chaired by Nobel Laureate Joseph Stiglitz and set up by President Sarkozy. She has also been consultant to the Planning Commission of India and is on the editorial boards of several international academic journals.

In 2009 Agarwal was nominated to the board of the United Nations Research Institute for Social Development (UNRISD) – such nominations are approved by the United Nations Economic and Social Council (ECOSOC). On 29 March 2010 the Global Development and Environment Institute (GDAE) awarded her the 2010 Leontief Prize – an annual award named after Nobel Laureate Wassily Leontief.  GDAE Co-Director Neva Goodwin wrote: "Bina Agarwal embodies the kind of theoretically rigorous, empirically grounded, and policy-oriented economics that the Leontief Prize was created to recognize," and "Her contributions to both scholarship and policy on economic development, the environment, well-being, and gender have been an inspiration to GDAE for many years." She is the currently president-elect of the International Society for Ecological Economics. She also heads a "Working Group on Disadvantaged Farmers, including Women" for India's 12th Five Year Plan, and is on the Indian Prime Minister's Panel on Land Reform. Additionally, Agarwal is on the advisory board for Academics Stand Against Poverty (ASAP).

In 2017, she received the Balzan Prize for Gender Studies in recognition of her work in studying women's contribution to agriculture in India.

Additional honours 
 First Ramesh Chandra Agrawal Award 2005 for Outstanding Contributions to Agricultural Economics.
 Malcolm Adiseshiah Award 2002 for Distinguished Contributions to Development Studies. 
 AWARDS for A Field of One's Own: Gender and Land Rights in South Asia:
 Ananda Kentish Coomaraswamy Book Prize 1996, given by the Association for Asian Studies (USA) (First South Asian to win the prize.) 
 Edgar Graham Book Prize 1996, given every two years by The University of London's the Department of Development Studies, School of Oriental and African Studies. 
 The K. H. Batheja Award 1995–96 given every two years by Bombay University and the Batheja Trust awarding the most deserving works about India and Development. 
 The Institute of Social Studies (ISS) awarded Agarwal with an honorary doctorate in 2007 and the University of Antwerp gave her an Honorary Doctorate in April 2011.
 Padma Shri awarded by the President of India in 2008

Selected works

Books

Chapters in books

Journals 
 
 
 
  Pdf.
  Pdf.

See also 
 Feminist economics
 List of feminist economists

References 

 Agarwal, Bina and Panda Pradeep (9/7/2003) "Home and the World: Revisiting Violence" in The Indian Express
 Agarwal, Bina (25 September 2005) “Landmark Step to Gender Equality” in The Hindu

External links
 http://www.binaagarwal.com 

Feminist economists
Indian development economists
20th-century Indian economists
Living people
Delhi University alumni
Harvard University staff
University of Michigan faculty
Recipients of the Padma Shri in literature & education
1951 births
Ecological economists
Indian women academics
Indian women economists
20th-century Indian educators
20th-century Indian women scientists
20th-century Indian women writers
20th-century Indian non-fiction writers
Indian political writers
Indian women educational theorists
Indian women political writers
20th-century Indian educational theorists
21st-century Indian women scientists
Women scientists from Delhi
Women writers from Delhi
Women educators from Delhi
Educators from Delhi
21st-century Indian economists
21st-century Indian women writers
21st-century Indian writers
20th-century women educators
Presidents of the International Association for Feminist Economics